This is a list of airports in Saint Vincent and the Grenadines, sorted by location.

Saint Vincent and the Grenadines lies to the west of Barbados, south of Saint Lucia, and north of Grenada in the Windward Islands of the Lesser Antilles, an island arc of the Caribbean Sea. The islands of Saint Vincent and the Grenadines include the main island of Saint Vincent  and the northern two-thirds of the Grenadines , which are a chain of smaller islands stretching south from Saint Vincent to Grenada. There are 32 islands and cays that make up St Vincent and the Grenadines (SVG). Nine are inhabited, including the mainland St. Vincent, Young Island, Bequia, Mustique, Canouan, Union Island, Mayreau, Petit St Vincent and Palm Island. The capital of Saint Vincent and the Grenadines is Kingstown.



Airports 

See also 

 Transport in Saint Vincent and the Grenadines
 List of airports by ICAO code: T#TV - Saint Vincent and the Grenadines
 
 Wikipedia: WikiProject Aviation/Airline destination lists: North America#Saint Vincent and the Grenadines

External links 

Lists of airports in Saint Vincent and the Grenadines:
Great Circle Mapper
Aircraft Charter World
The Airport Guide
World Aero Data
St Vincent and the Grenadines Airport - SVD

References

Other sites used as a reference when compiling and updating this list:
 Aviation Safety Network - used to check IATA airport codes

 
Saint Vincent and the Grenadines
Airports
Saint Vincent and the Grenadines